"El Chapo" is the second single by American rapper The Game with American electronic music producer and DJ Skrillex, taken from his sixth studio album, The Documentary 2.5. The song features production by Mr. Bangladesh, Skrillex, and Nastradomas.

Certifications

Charts

References

2015 singles
The Game (rapper) songs
2015 songs
Skrillex songs
Songs written by Bangladesh (record producer)
Song recordings produced by Bangladesh (record producer)
Songs written by Skrillex
Song recordings produced by Skrillex
Songs written by The Game (rapper)
MNRK Music Group singles